Hispanic Africa is a cultural region integrated by the territories and countries of Africa where Spanish has an official presence. The people from this region are called "Hispanic Africans".

The territory is integrated by two countries, Equatorial Guinea and Western Sahara (in dispute with Morocco), the territories of Spain which are geographically in Africa and in addition to the areas of Saharawi presence in Algeria. The countries have 1.9 million inhabitants, the Spanish territories 2.3 million and in total both have 4.3 million. 

Spanish coexists with other native languages such as Fang and other languages of Equatorial Guinea, while in the Sahara it coexists with Arabic. The predominant religion in Equatorial Guinea is Christianity, especially Catholicism, while in the Sahara it is Islam.

Countries

Territories 

 Canary Islands, Spain
 Ceuta, Spain
 Melilla, Spain
 Plazas de soberanía, Spain
 Tindouf Province refugee camps, Algeria

See also 

 Saharan Spanish
 Spanish Africa (disambiguation)
 Equatoguinean Spanish
 Canarian Spanish
 Françafrique

References 

Spanish language in Africa
Africa